Ellen Moons is a Belgian materials scientist who is a professor at Karlstad University. Her research considers the organisation of molecules and materials in thin films. She is mainly interested in organic and hybrid materials for solution processed photovoltaics.

Early life and education 
Moons is from Belgium. As an undergraduate, she studied physics at Ghent University. After finishing her MSc studies, she was awarded a scholarship by the Israeli Foreign Ministry, and spent half a year in Israel. She decided to stay for doctoral studies, and worked at the Weizmann Institute of Science alongside David Cahen. Her doctoral research considered photovoltaic cells based on cadmium telluride. These photovoltaics have lower costs than silicon based devices, and have a small carbon footprint. Moons was a postdoctoral researcher at École Polytechnique Fédérale de Lausanne and at the Delft University of Technology. Her research considered dye-sensitised solar cells.

Moons worked as a research scientist at Cambridge Display Technology, where she worked on polymer light-emitting diodes. During this time she held a joint position with the University of Cambridge, and worked alongside Richard Friend.

Research and career 

Moons joined Karlstad University in 2011. That year she was awarded the Göran Gustafsson Prize. At the time, Karlstad primarily focussed on polymer-based photovoltaics. Moons expanded this research area, introducing new materials and investigations into structure-property relationships. Moons works to understand degradation mechanisms within emerging energy materials in an effort to improve device performance, stability and lifetime.

Moons' group have helped to correlate solar cell morphology with performance. In particular, she helped to explain how the donor and acceptor domains that form within the active layers of solar cells during solution processing impact their performance. Her work on morphology was supported by the K. A. Wallenberg foundation. Alongside the morphology of the active layer, she has studied how the device energetics (e.g. energy levels of the interlayers and interfaces) impact device performance.

Moons has made use of atomic force microscopy to understand nanoscale features on the surface of her thin films. To interrogate the chemical composition of these domains, Moons has shown it is possible to combine atomic force microscopy with infrared spectroscopy. To probe the bulk structure of the thin films, Moons uses dynamic secondary ion mass spectrometry.

In 2018, Moons was elected to the Royal Swedish Academy of Sciences. She was one of five women in a class of fifty five, and the first  member from Karlstad University to be elected. She said she would use the position to advance the role of physics in society. As part of this role, she served on the Nobel Committee for Physics and delivered a YouTube lesson describing the science that won the 2018 Nobel Prize in Physics.

Selected publications

References 

Living people
Weizmann Institute of Science alumni
Karlstad University alumni
Materials scientists and engineers
Belgian women scientists
Year of birth missing (living people)